Aiouea benthamiana is a species of plant in the family Lauraceae. It is found in Brazil, Colombia, and Venezuela.

References

benthamiana
Least concern plants
Taxonomy articles created by Polbot